The Wind Blows is a 2019 South Korean television series starring Kam Woo-sung, Kim Ha-neul, Kim Sung-cheol, and Kim Ga-eun. It aired on JTBC's Mondays and Tuesdays at 21:30 (KST) time slot from May 27 to July 16, 2019.

Synopsis
Do-hoon divorced Soo-jin when he learned that he had Alzheimer's disease. They meet again five years later and Soo-jin learned the reason that lead to the divorce back then. She suffered to overcome the pain and decided to be by Do-hoon's side once again.

Cast

Main
 Kam Woo-sung as Kwon Do-hoon
 Kim Ha-neul as Lee Soo-jin
 Kim Sung-cheol as Bryan Jung
 Kim Ga-eun as Son Ye-rim

Supporting
 Lee Jun-hyeok as Choi Hang-seo
 Yoon Ji-hye as Baek Soo-ah
 Park Hyo-joo as Jo Mi-kyung
 Kim Young-jae as Moon Kyung-hoon
 Lee Hang-na as Kim Hee-eun
 Jeon Guk-hyang as Soo-jin's mother
 Choi Hwi-do as Lee Soo-chul
 Kim Ik-tae as Do-hoon's doctor
 Han Ji-hyun as Lee Sun-kyung, Son Ye-rim's co-worker
 Ahn Dong-goo as young Kwon Do-hoon
 Jung Da-eun as young Lee Soo-in.
Hong Je Yi as Lee Ah Ram Soo Jin's daughter

Special appearances
 Jo Woo-ri as Choi Seung-yeon (Ep. 3–4)
 Seol Jung-hwan as Kim Ji-hoon (Ep.7–8, 11)

Production
The first script reading took place on March 21, 2019.

Viewership

Awards and nominations

References

External links
  
 The Wind Blows at Drama House 
 The Wind Blows at Salt Light Media 
 
 

Korean-language television shows
JTBC television dramas
2019 South Korean television series debuts
2019 South Korean television series endings
South Korean melodrama television series
Television series by Drama House